The Lark was a paddle steamer employed by the Confederate States of America during the American Civil War. She was the last blockade runner to successfully escape from a Southern port before the Union blockade completely closed off this vital source of supplies.

Lark was designed and built by John Laird & Sons. The ship made four successful round trips through the blockade between Galveston, Texas, and Havana, Cuba. In April 1865, she ran aground near the entrance to Galveston harbor. Two launches dispatched from the Union blockading squadron attacked the Lark, which managed to fend off the assault with help from Confederate ground forces. On May 24, she dashed into Galveston again and managed to slip through the blockade back out to open sea, the last Confederate blockade runner to do so.

References
 Galveston Weekly News, April 26, 1865

External links
 "Life on the Texan Blockade," MOLLUS War Papers

Texas in the American Civil War
Blockade runners of the Confederate States Navy
Paddle steamers
Ships built on the River Mersey
Blockades